Gilla Mo Dutu Úa Caiside (fl. 1147) was a Gaelic Irish poet.

Biography

Closely associated with Tighearnán Ua Ruairc, King of Bréifne, he was attached to the monastery of Daminis and possibly to the church of Ard Brecáin, being a cleric.

His two famous compositions are Éri óg inis na náem and the Banshenchas.

The Ó Caiside family later became – from the 14th century – prominent in Fermanagh, and many of them became hereditary doctors to the Maguire chieftains.

His known compositions are:

 Éri óg inis na náem
 The Banshenchas (Ádam óenathair na ndóene)
 Eight poems in the lives of St. Mo Laisse and M'Áedóc
 Ca lion mionn ag Maodhócc
 Cert Maodhócc ar shluagh Mhancach
 Comhroinn Maodhócc, fa mór modh
 Eittirbretha Maodhócc min
 Uasal an mac, mac Setna
 Cia is fearr cairt ar dháil mláisi
 Cia thairngir mlaisi ria theacht
 Molaisi eolach na heagna 
 Cuibdea comanmann na rig
 Sé rígh déag Eoghain anall

References
 The Prose Banshenchas, unpublished Ph.D. Dissertation, UCG, 1980. 
 The Manuscript Tradition of the Banshenchas, Éiru 33 (1982) 109-35
 An Bansheanchas, Léachtaí Cholm Cille xii: Na mná sa litríocht, eag. P. Ó Fiannachta (Maigh Nuad, 1982), 5-29.
 Gilla Mo Dutu Úa Caiside, by Kevin Murray, in Cín Chille Cúile, ed. J. Carey, M. Herbert and K. Murray (Aberystwyth: Celtic Studies Publications, 2004), 150–162.

12th-century Irish poets
People from County Meath
People from County Fermanagh
12th-century Irish historians
Irish religious writers
Medieval European scribes
Irish scribes
Irish male poets
Medieval Gaels from Ireland
Irish-language writers